Atle Sturla Kvålsvoll (born 10 April 1962) is a Norwegian former professional road cyclist. He rode the Tour de France six times between 1988 and 1994, finishing four times. His best performance was in 1990, when he finished 26th and contributed to Greg LeMond's winning the yellow jersey. He competed in the individual road race event at the 1984 Summer Olympics.

Kvålsvoll finished second in the American Tour DuPont in 1990, 1991 and 1992 and then finished 3rd in 1993. He also won a stage in 1991 and 1992.

Kvålsvoll is employed by the Norwegian sports organisation Olympiatoppen and was Thor Hushovd's coach.

In 2011 he has also accepted a role as directeur sportif for UCI Continental Team Plussbank Cervélo.

Major results

1984
 2nd Overall Tour of Norway
1985
 3rd Overall Tour of Sweden
 4th Overall Tour of Norway
1st Stage 6
1987
 9th Overall Tour of Sweden
1988
 3rd Duo Normand (with Olaf Lurvik)
 5th Overall Tour du Limousin
1989
 1st Overall Tour of Sweden
1st Stage 4
 2nd Tour de Vendée
 4th GP Ouest–France
 9th Overall Four Days of Dunkirk
 9th Overall Circuit Cycliste Sarthe
1990
 1st Overall Tour du Vaucluse
 2nd Overall Tour de Trump
 3rd Time trial, National Road Championships
 6th Overall Tour de Suisse
 10th Liège–Bastogne–Liège
1991
 1st Trophée des Grimpeurs
 2nd Overall Tour DuPont
1st Stage 6
 9th Overall Paris–Nice
 10th Overall Circuit Cycliste Sarthe
1992
 2nd Overall Tour DuPont
1st Stage 6
 4th Paris–Camembert
 6th La Flèche Wallonne
 8th Trophée des Grimpeurs
1993
 3rd Overall Tour DuPont
 8th Trophée des Grimpeurs

Grand Tour general classification results timeline

References

1962 births
Living people
Norwegian male cyclists
Cycling coaches
Olympic cyclists of Norway
Cyclists at the 1984 Summer Olympics
Sportspeople from Trondheim